To Love Somebody (Chinese: 求爱嫁期) is a 2014 Chinese romance film directed by Francis Sung.

Cast
Tong Yao
Shen Lin
Qiao Zhenyu
Michael Tong
Tong Lei
Fang Zibin
Zhao Siyuan
Li Chengyuan
Wang Yi
Ma Xiaocan
Liang Dawei
Gilbert Lam
Zhang Xiaojue
Liu Yizhou
Qi Ji
Francis Sung

Reception
The film has grossed US$0.58 million at the Chinese box office.

References

2014 romance films
Chinese romance films